Mary Barber (3 April 1911 – 11 September 1965) was a British pathologist and bacteriologist who studied antibiotic resistance in bacteria. She was one of the pioneers in this field, documenting the phenomenon of penicillin resistance early on.

Life 
Barber was born on 3 April 1911 in Derby. Her mother was Ethel Howlett and her father, a physician, was Hugh Barber; the couple had two daughters before Mary. She was the only daughter to go into medicine; she was a fifth-generation physician. Barber received her early education at the Alice Ottley School in Worcester. For most of her life, she lived in a London flat; she never married.  She died on 11 September 1965 at the age of 54. She and a companion were killed in a car accident while en route to a Campaign for Nuclear Disarmament meeting. Throughout her life Barber possessed strong political and religious beliefs, as a firm political liberal and devout Anglican. She was known for her distinctive appearance, including glasses, no makeup, a pulled-back hairstyle, and utilitarian clothing. Her hobbies included boating.

Scientific career 
Educated at the London School of Medicine for Women, she received her joint degree from the school and the Royal Free Hospital in 1934 and her M.B. B.S. two years later. While studying for her M.D., Barber held several different academic positions. From 1936 to 1937, she was a resident assistant in the Pathology Unit of the Royal Free Hospital. The next year, she was named the A. M. Bird Scholar in Pathology. In 1938, she moved to the Archway Group Laboratory, where she was an assistant pathologist until 1939; that year, she took the same position at Hill End and the City Hospitals, St. Albans. After she received her M.D. in 1940, Barber became a lecturer of bacteriology and assistant pathologist at the British Postgraduate Medical School and Hammersmith Hospital, positions she held until 1948. From 1948 to 1958, she was a reader in bacteriology at St. Thomas's Hospital. In 1958, she returned to the British Postgraduate Medical School to be a reader in clinical bacteriology; in 1963, she became a professor, a position she held until 1965.

Barber's research was focused on the staphylococcus bacterium as well as various aspects of antibiotics, especially development of penicillin-resistant bacteria. Her first scientific paper was published in 1937 and concerned meningitis caused by the Listeria bacterium. In 1947, she published her best-known work, on penicillin resistance in staphylocci, proving that the bacteria were becoming more resistant to the drug over time, using the new technique of phage typing. She found that this was because bacteria with mutations that caused them to synthesize a penicillin-destroying enzyme were selected during treatment with antibiotics, leading to rapid spread of a single antibiotic-resistant strain throughout the hospital. Between 1948 and 1958, her focus shifted to cross-infection by Staphylococcus in hospitals, which she found to be caused by penicilin-resistant bacteria and the nurses became nasal carriers soon after working on the wards. After she returned to BPMS (British Postgraduate Medical School) in 1958, she expanded upon this work, making a clear case for limiting antibiotic use and combining drugs for maximum effect and minimal increases in drug resistance; these studies were carried out at St. Thomas' Hospital. The policies implemented as a result of her work caused antibiotic resistance observed in the hospital to drop dramatically. After her successful publications, Barber was hired by the Medical Research Council to study semisynthetic penicillin, cephalosporin, fucidin, lincomycin, and pristinamycin. In 1963, she published Antibiotic and Chemotherapy with L. P. Garrod, an encyclopaedic work on the characteristics and medical uses of various antibiotics. That same year, Barber was appointed a professor; in 1965 she was elected to the Royal College of Physicians.

Throughout her career, Barber was known for being a conscientious and intelligent scientist.

References 
Citations

References
 
 
 
 

1911 births
1965 deaths
English bacteriologists
British pathologists
20th-century British biologists
Women microbiologists
British women biologists
People from Derby
People educated at The Alice Ottley School
20th-century British women scientists
Alumni of the London School of Medicine for Women